Souleymane Diarra  (born 30 January 1995) is a Malian professional footballer who plays as a midfielder for Ligue 2 club Guingamp.

Club career
In August 2015, Diarra joined Hungarian side Újpest FC on a three-year deal.

On 3 August 2019, Diarra signed a three-year contract with Turkish Süper Lig club Gazişehir Gaziantep.

On 18 January 2021, Diarra signed with Ligue 2 club Pau FC.

International career
Diarra was part of the Malian squad reaching 2015 FIFA U-20 World Cup semi-final. He also played in the 2016 Toulon Tournament. Diarra made his senior debut for the Mali national football team in a 3–1 win against China, wherein he got a red card on the 38th minute on 29 June 2016.

References

External links
 

1995 births
Living people
Sportspeople from Bamako
Association football midfielders
Malian footballers
Mali international footballers
Mali under-20 international footballers
Nemzeti Bajnokság I players
Ligue 2 players
Süper Lig players
Újpest FC players
RC Lens players
Gaziantep F.K. footballers
Pau FC players
En Avant Guingamp players
Malian Première Division players
AS Bamako players
Malian expatriate footballers
Malian expatriate sportspeople in Hungary
Malian expatriate sportspeople in France
Malian expatriate sportspeople in Turkey
Expatriate footballers in Hungary
Expatriate footballers in France
Expatriate footballers in Turkey
21st-century Malian people